Belmont is a town in Saint Patrick parish in Grenada.

References

Populated places in Grenada